Okefenokee Wilderness is a 353,981 acre (1,432.5 km2) U.S. Wilderness Area located in southeastern Georgia in the Okefenokee National Wildlife Refuge. It was established and governed under the Wilderness Act of 1974 when  were designated as wilderness by Public Law 93-429. The wilderness area is located entirely within the state of Georgia, even though small parts of Okefenokee National Wildlife Refuge and Okefenokee Swamp both extend southward into the state of Florida.

Located in the heart of the Okefenokee Swamp, this tract of land has been set aside for future generations to enjoy. No further uses such as timber harvesting, farming, or road building will be permitted. While the public is invited to engage in recreational opportunities such as fishing, hiking, canoeing, and wildlife observation, all uses are primitive and nondestructive and all access is by either foot traffic or boat. Boats having 10 hp or less are allowed and can be rented along with canoes at the two main entrance ways on either side (West or East) of the swamp.

See also 
 List of U.S. Wilderness Areas
 Okefenokee National Wildlife Refuge
 Okefenokee Swamp

External links
 Wilderness.net
 Recreation.gov overview
 Okefenokee Swamp Park homepage

Protected areas of Charlton County, Georgia
Protected areas of Clinch County, Georgia
IUCN Category Ib
Protected areas of Ware County, Georgia
Wilderness areas of Georgia (U.S. state)
Protected areas established in 1974